This article documents the statistics of the 2019 Rugby World Cup which was held in Japan from 20 September to 2 November.

Russia's Kirill Golosnitsky scored the first try of the tournament and Kotaro Matsushima of Japan scored the first hat-trick of the tournament. Camille Lopez of France scored the first drop goal of the tournament. Dan Biggar of Wales scored the fastest drop goal in Rugby World Cup history, after only 35 seconds in a pool match, Cobus Reinach of South Africa scored the fastest hat-trick ever, scoring his 3rd try after only 20 minutes in the pool stage.

Team statistics
The following table shows the team's results in major statistical categories.

Source: ESPNscrum.com

Try scorers
7 tries

 Josh Adams

6 tries

 Makazole Mapimpi

5 tries

 Kotaro Matsushima

4 tries

 Julián Montoya
 Kenki Fukuoka
 Ben Smith

3 tries

 Dane Haylett-Petty
 Marika Koroibete
 Luke Cowan-Dickie
 Jonny May
 Manu Tuilagi
 Andrew Conway
 Beauden Barrett
 Jordie Barrett
 George Horne
 Cheslin Kolbe
 Bongi Mbonambi
 Cobus Reinach
 Telusa Veainu

2 tries

 Juan Cruz Mallia
 Joaquín Tuculet
 Will Genia
 Michael Hooper
 Tevita Kuridrani
 Tolu Latu
 Joe Cokanasiga
 George Ford
 Niko Matawalu
 Waisea Nayacalevu
 Semi Radradra
 Api Ratuniyarawa
 Josua Tuisova
 Gaël Fickou
 Alivereti Raka
 Virimi Vakatawa
 Levan Chilachava
 Alexander Todua
 Rory Best
 Tadhg Furlong
 Rob Kearney
 Garry Ringrose
 Johnny Sexton
 Mattia Bellini
 Matteo Minozzi
 Scott Barrett
 George Bridge 
 Anton Lienert-Brown
 Joe Moody
 Sevu Reece
 Aaron Smith
 Brad Weber
 Ed Fidow
 Alapati Leiua
 Adam Hastings
 Lukhanyo Am
 Schalk Brits
 Damian de Allende
 Warrick Gelant
 Mali Hingano
 Blaine Scully
 Mike Te'o
 Manuel Diana
 Gareth Davies
 Liam Williams
 Tomos Williams

1 try

 Gonzalo Bertranou
 Santiago Carreras
 Jerónimo de la Fuente
 Matías Moroni
 Guido Petti
 Nicolás Sánchez
 Adam Ashley-Cooper
 Jack Dempsey
 Reece Hodge
 Samu Kerevi
 Jordan Petaia
 James Slipper
 Nic White
 Andrew Coe
 Matt Heaton
 Elliot Daly
 Jamie George
 Lewis Ludlam
 Ruaridh McConnochie
 Jack Nowell
 Kyle Sinckler
 Billy Vunipola
 Ben Youngs
 Anthony Watson
 Mesu Dolokoto
 Semi Kunatani
 Frank Lomani
 Eroni Mawi
 Kini Murimurivalu
 Peceli Yato 
 Antoine Dupont
 Yoann Huget
 Charles Ollivon
 Jefferson Poirot
 Baptiste Serin
 Sébastien Vahaamahina
 Jaba Bregvadze
 Otar Giorgadze
 Mamuka Gorgodze
 Giorgi Kveseladze
 Shalva Mamukashvili
 Robbie Henshaw
 Jordan Larmour
 Peter O'Mahony
 Rhys Ruddock
 James Ryan
 CJ Stander
 Tommaso Allan
 Dean Budd
 Carlo Canna
 Sebastian Negri
 Jake Polledri
 Braam Steyn
 Tito Tebaldi
 Federico Zani
 Keita Inagaki
 Pieter Labuschagne
 Kazuki Himeno
 Timothy Lafaele
 JC Greyling
 Chad Plato
 Damian Stevens 
 Ryan Crotty
 Shannon Frizell
 Rieko Ioane
 Richie Mo'unga
 TJ Perenara
 Ardie Savea
 Angus Ta'avao
 Codie Taylor
 Matt Todd
 Sam Whitelock
 Sonny Bill Williams
 Kirill Golosnitsky
 Afa Amosa
 Jack Lam
 Rey Lee-Lo
 Henry Taefu
 John Barclay
 Zander Fagerson
 Greig Laidlaw
 Sean Maitland
 Stuart McInally
 Finn Russell
 Tommy Seymour
 George Turner
 WP Nel
 Faf de Klerk
 Frans Malherbe
 Pieter-Steph du Toit
 Siya Kolisi
 Francois Louw
 Frans Malherbe
 Malcolm Marx
 S'busiso Nkosi
 RG Snyman
 François Steyn
 Damian Willemse
 Siegfried Fisiihoi
 Zane Kapeli
 Siale Piutau
 Sonatane Takulua
 Bryce Campbell
 Tony Lamborn
 Paul Lasike
 Santiago Arata
 Germán Kessler
 Juan Manuel Cat
 Andrés Vilaseca
 Hallam Amos
 Jonathan Davies
 Ross Moriarty
 George North
 Hadleigh Parkes
 Nicky Smith
 Justin Tipuric
 Aaron Wainwright

Conversion scorers
20 conversions

 Richie Mo'unga

14 conversions

 Elton Jantjies

11 conversions

 Owen Farrell

10 conversions

 Dan Biggar

9 conversions

 Yu Tamura
 Handré Pollard

8 conversions

 Johnny Sexton
 Jordie Barrett
 Adam Hastings

7 conversions

 Christian Lealiifano

6 conversions

 Nicolás Sánchez
 Matt To'omua
 Ben Volavola
 Romain Ntamack
 Tedo Abzhandadze
 Tommaso Allan
 Felipe Berchesi
 Leigh Halfpenny

5 conversions

 Benjamín Urdapilleta
 George Ford
 Sonatane Takulua

4 conversions

 Greig Laidlaw
 AJ MacGinty

3 conversions

 Camille Lopez
 Joey Carbery
 Jack Carty
 Carlo Canna
 Rhys Patchell

2 conversions

 Peter Nelson
 Cliven Loubser
 Tusi Pisi

1 conversion

 Emiliano Boffelli
 Josh Matavesi
 Thomas Ramos
 Soso Matiashvili
 Conor Murray
 Rikiya Matsuda
 Yuri Kushnarev
 Henry Taefu
 Finn Russell
 James Faiva
 Latiume Fosita
 Siale Piutau

Penalty goal scorers
16 penalties

 Handré Pollard

12 penalties

 Owen Farrell

11 penalties

 Yu Tamura

6 penalties

 Felipe Berchesi
 Dan Biggar

5 penalties

 Romain Ntamack
 Rhys Patchell

4 penalties

 George Ford
 Henry Taefu

3 penalties

 Benjamín Urdapilleta
 Christian Lealiifano
 Ben Volavola
 Damian Stevens
 Richie Mo'unga
 Yuri Kushnarev
 AJ MacGinty

2 penalties

 Matt To'omua
 Soso Matiashvili
 Tommaso Allan
 Cliven Loubser
 Greig Laidlaw
 Sonatane Takulua

1 penalty

 Nicolás Sánchez
 Bernard Foley
 Reece Hodge
 Jack Carty
 Beauden Barrett

Drop goal scorers
1 drop goal

 Camille Lopez
 Yuri Kushnarev
 Stuart Hogg
 Handré Pollard
 Dan Biggar
 Rhys Patchell

Point scorers

Kicking accuracy

Scoring

Overall
 Total number of points scored: 2,195
 Average points per match: 48.8
 Total number of tries scored: 285 (including 8 penalty tries)
 Average tries per match: 6.3
 Total number of braces: 28
 Total number of hat-tricks: 5
 Total number of conversions missed: 277
 Total number of conversions scored: 69
 Conversion success rate: ??%
 Total number of penalty goals missed: ??
 Total number of penalty goals scored: 107
 Penalty goal success rate: ??%
 Total number of drop goals scored: 6

Timing
 First try of the tournament: Kirill Golosnitsky for Russia against Japan
 First brace of the tournament: Kotaro Matsushima for Japan against Russia
 First hat-trick of the tournament: Kotaro Matsushima for Japan against Russia
 Last try of the tournament: Cheslin Kolbe for South Africa against England
 Last brace of the tournament: Ben Smith for New Zealand against Wales
 Last hat-trick of the tournament: Josh Adams for Wales against Fiji
 Fastest try in a match from kickoff: 2nd minute (1:29), Rob Kearney for Ireland against Russia
 Fastest try in a match from a restart-kick: 19 seconds after a restart, Gareth Davies for Wales against Australia
 Latest try in a match: 80+5th minute (84:26), Kotaro Matsushima for Japan against Samoa
 Fastest Bonus Point try: 18th minute (17:21), Cobus Reinach for South Africa against Canada
 Latest Bonus Point try: 80+5th minute (84:26), Kotaro Matsushima for Japan against Samoa
 Fastest point scored in a match: 1st minute (00:36), Dan Biggar's drop-goal for Wales against Australia

Teams
 Most points scored by a team in the pool stage: 185 by South Africa
 Fewest points scored by a team in the pool stage: 14 by Canada
 Most points conceded by a team in the pool stage: 177 by Canada
 Fewest points conceded by a team in the pool stage: 27 by Ireland
 Best point difference by a team in the pool stage: +149 by South Africa
 Worst point difference by a team in the pool stage: −163 by Canada
 Most points scored by a team in the knockout stage: 93 by New Zealand
 Fewest points scored by a team in the knockout stage: 3 by Japan
 Most points conceded by a team in the knockout stage: 78 by wales
 Fewest points conceded by a team in the knockout stage: 20 by France
 Most points scored by a team overall: 262 by South Africa
 Fewest points conceded by a team overall: 55 by Scotland
 Most points scored in a match by both teams: 80 points, New Zealand 71–9 Namibia
 Most points scored in a match by one team: 71 by New Zealand
 Most points scored in a match by the losing team: 27 by Fiji
 Biggest margin of victory: 63 by New Zealand
 Most tries scored by a team in the pool stage: 27 by South Africa
 Most tries scored by a team in the knockout stage: 14 by New Zealand
 Fewest tries scored by a team: 1 by Russia
 Most tries scored in a match: 11 tries, New Zealand (11) vs Namibia (0) andSouth Africa (10) vs Canada (1)
 Most tries scored in a match by one team: 11 by New Zealand
 Most wins achieved by a team: 6 by South Africa
 Fewest wins achieved by a team: 0 by
 Canada
 Namibia
 Russia
 United States
 Most losses achieved by a team: 4 by
 Russia
 United States
 Fewest losses achieved by a team: 1 by
 England
 France
 Italy
 Japan
 New Zealand
 South Africa
 Most consecutive wins achieved by a team: 6 by South Africa
 Most consecutive losses achieved by a team: 4 by
 Russia
 United States
 Most pool points: 19 by Japan and Wales
 Fewest pool points: 0 by Russia and United States 
 Most bonus points: 4 by South Africa
 Fewest bonus points: 0 by
 Russia
 United States
 Largest ranking difference win by a lower ranked team: 9 places – Uruguay (19th) vs Fiji (10th)
 Largest ranking difference win by a higher ranked team: 21 places – New Zealand (1st) vs Canada (22nd)

Individual
 Most points scored by an individual: 69 - Handré Pollard (South Africa)
 Most tries scored by an individual (Back): 7 - Josh Adams (Wales)
 Most tries scored by an individual (Forward): 4 - Julián Montoya (Argentina)
 Most conversions scored by an individual: 20 - Richie Mo'unga (New Zealand)
 Most penalty goals scored by an individual: 16 - Handré Pollard (South Africa)
 Most drop goals scored by an individual: 1
 Camille Lopez (France)
 Yuri Kushnarev (Russia)
 Stuart Hogg (Scotland)
 Handré Pollard (South Africa)
 Dan Biggar (Wales)
 Rhys Patchell (Wales)
 Most tackles made by an individual: 79 -  Alun Wyn Jones (Wales)
 Most lineouts won by an individual: 26 - Guido Petti (Argentina)
 Most lineouts stolen by an individual: 5
 Guido Petti (Argentina)
 Izack Rodda (Australia)
 Most clean breaks made by an individual: 18 - Josh Adams (Wales)
 Most offloads made by an individual: 12 - Leone Nakarawa (Fiji)
 Most metres made by an individual: 460 - Beauden Barrett (New Zealand)
 Most carries made by an individual: 86 - Beauden Barrett (New Zealand)
 Most turnovers won by an individual: 11 - Maro Itoje (England)
 Most points scored by one player in a match: 26 - Adam Hastings for Scotland vs Russia
 Most tries scored by one player in a match: 3
Josh Adams for Wales vs Fiji
George Horne for Scotland vs Russia
Kotaro Matsushima for Japan vs Russia
Julián Montoya for Argentina vs Tonga
Cobus Reinach for South Africa vs Canada
 Most conversions scored by one player in a match: 8
Jordie Barrett for New Zealand vs Namibia
Adam Hastings for Scotland vs Russia
Elton Jantjies for South Africa vs Canada
Richie Mo'unga for New Zealand vs Canada
 Most penalty goals scored by one player in a match: 6 - Handré Pollard for South Africa vs England
 Highest kicking accuracy by an individual: 100%
 Benjamín Urdapilleta (Argentina)
 Peter Nelson (Canada)
 Joey Carbery (Ireland)
 Rikiya Matsuda (Japan)
 Damian Stevens (Namibia)
 Yuri Kushnarev (Russia)
 Greig Laidlaw (Scotland)
 Stuart Hogg (Scotland)
 Finn Russell (Scotland)
 Latiume Fosita (Tonga)
 Highest kicking accuracy by an individual (minimum 10 attempts): 70.27% - Handré Pollard for South Africa
 Lowest kicking accuracy by an individual: 0%
 Ramil Gaisin (Russia)
 AJ Alatimu (Samoa)
 Lowest kicking accuracy by an individual (minimum 10 attempts): 70% - Nicolás Sánchez for Argentina

Hat-tricks
Unless otherwise noted, players in this list scored a hat-trick of tries.

Man of the match awards

Squads

Coaches
 Oldest coach: Jacques Brunel of France - (65 years and 279 days) in the quarter-final game against Wales.
 Youngest coach: Toutai Kefu of Tonga - (45 years and 167 days) in the first game against England.
 Country with most coaches: New Zealand (7)
 John Mckee of Fiji
 Milton Haig of Georgia
 Joe Schmidt of Ireland
 Jamie Joseph of Japan
 Steve Hansen of New Zealand
 Steve Jackson of Samoa
 Warren Gatland of Wales
 Teams with foreign coaches: 14
 Canada
 England
 Fiji
 Georgia
 Ireland
 Italy
 Japan
 Namibia
 Russia
 Samoa
 Tonga
 United States
 Uruguay
 Wales
 Coaches who were former players: 7.
 Phil Davies of Namibia (1987 and 1991 with Wales)
 Rassie Erasmus of South Africa (1999 with South Africa)
 Jamie Joseph of Japan (1995 with New Zealand and 1999 with Japan)
 Toutai Kefu of Tonga (1999 with Australia)
 Mario Ledesma of Argentina (1999, 2003, 2007 and 2011 with Argentina)
 Conor O'Shea of Italy (1995 and 1999 with Ireland)
 Gregor Townsend of Scotland (1999 and 2003 with Scotland)
 Longest serving coach: Warren Gatland of Wales since November 2007.
 Shortest serving coach: Steve Jackson of Samoa since September 2018.
 Coaches with previous Head Coaching World Cup experience: 10
 Jacques Brunel of France (Head Coach of Italy in 2015)
 Michael Cheika of Australia (Head Coach of Australia in 2015)
 Phil Davies of Namibia (Head Coach of Namibia in 2015)
 Warren Gatland of Wales (Head Coach of Ireland in 1999 & Head Coach of Wales in 2011 & 2015)
 Milton Haig of Georgia (Head Coach of Georgia in 2015)
 Steve Hansen of New Zealand (Head Coach of Wales in 2003 & Head Coach of New Zealand in 2015)
 Eddie Jones of England (Head Coach of Australia in 2003 & Head Coach of Japan in 2015)
 Kingsley Jones of Canada (Head Coach of Russia in 2011)
 John McKee of Fiji (Head Coach of Fiji in 2015)
 Joe Schmidt of Ireland (Head Coach of Ireland in 2015)

Players
 Five squads had no players based outside their respective home countries:
 England
 France
 Ireland
 Japan
 New Zealand
 Squads having the fewest players playing domestically are: Tonga (0)
  The most players (96) are active in clubs based in France, the majority of them in the Top 14, with some in the lower leagues.
 Appearance record: Sergio Parisse of Italy participated in the Rugby World Cup for the fifth time, equalling the record of compatriot Mauro Bergamasco and Samoa player Brian Lima.
 Oldest player: Luke Thompson of Japan (38 years and 187 days - vs South Africa)
 Youngest player: Vano Karkadze of Georgia (19 years and 96 days - vs Uruguay)
 Beauden Barrett, Jordie Barrett and Scott Barrett became the first trio of brothers to start in a World Cup match (vs Canada) for New Zealand, and the second set to all start in a Rugby World Cup match since Tonga's Elisi Vunipola, Manu Vunipola, and Fe'ao Vunipola in 1995 (vs Scotland). The Barrett brothers are the first trio of brothers to score a try in the same match.

Discipline
 Fewest penalties conceded by a team: 19 by Uruguay
 Most penalties conceded by a team: 61 by Wales
 Fewest penalties conceded on average matches played: 4.75 by Uruguay (4 Games played)
 Most penalties conceded on average matches played: 12.75 by Samoa (4 Games played)
 Most penalties conceded by an individual: 10 by Tyler Ardron (Canada)
 Most penalty tries conceded by one team: 2 by
 Canada
 Samoa
 Most penalty tries conceded by one team in a match: 2 by Samoa vs Scotland
 Most yellow cards issued to one team: 6 by Samoa
 Most red cards issued to one team: 1 by
 Argentina
 Canada
 France
 Ireland
 Italy
 Samoa
 Uruguay
 United States
 Most cards issued in one match: 4, Wales (2) vs Fiji (2)
 Most citing's issued to one team: 4 by Samoa

Yellow cards
2 yellow cards
 Ed Fidow (both vs Scotland)
 TJ Ioane (vs Japan & Ireland)

1 yellow card

 Adam Coleman (vs Uruguay)
 Isi Naisarani (vs Georgia)
 Lukhan Salakaia-Loto (vs Uruguay)
 Matt Heaton (vs Italy)
 Levani Botia (vs Australia)
 Tevita Cavubati (vs Wales)
 Semi Kunatani (vs Wales)
 Jaba Bregvadze (vs Wales)
 Tadhg Beirne (vs Scotland)
 Adriaan Booysen (vs South Africa)
 Aranos Coetzee (vs South Africa)
 Nepo Laulala (vs Namibia)
 Matt Todd (vs Ireland)
 Ofa Tu'ungafasi (vs Namibia)
 Bogdan Fedotko (vs Ireland)
 Kirill Gotovtsev (vs Samoa)
 Andrei Ostrikov (vs Ireland)
 Rey Lee-Lo (vs Russia)
 Motu Matu'u (vs Russia)
 Tendai Mtawarira (vs Japan)
 Santiago Civetta (vs Wales)
 James Davies (vs Fiji)
 Ken Owens (vs Fiji)
 Ross Moriarty (vs France)

Red cards
A record fifth red card for a Rugby World Cup was issued, surpassing the four given out in 1995 and 1999. In total, eight red cards were issued during the tournament.

1 red card

 Tomás Lavanini (vs England)
 Josh Larsen (vs South Africa)
 Sébastien Vahaamahina (vs Wales)
 Bundee Aki (vs Samoa)
 Andrea Lovotti (vs South Africa)
 Ed Fidow (vs Scotland)
 Facundo Gattas (vs Georgia)
 John Quill (vs England)

Penalty tries
2 penalty tries

Awarded against , vs 

1 penalty try

Awarded against , vs 
Awarded against , vs 
Awarded against , vs 
Awarded against , vs 
Awarded against , vs 
Awarded against , vs

Citing/bans
For the 2019 Rugby World Cup, Citing Commissioner Warnings carry the same weight as a yellow card.

Stadiums

Attendances

Top 10 highest attendances.

Lowest attendance: 14,025 –  vs , Kamaishi Recovery Memorial Stadium, Kamaishi, 25 September 2019

See also
 2015 Rugby World Cup statistics
 Records and statistics of the Rugby World Cup
 List of Rugby World Cup hat-tricks
 List of Rugby World Cup red cards

External links
Rugby World Cup Stats 
Disciplinary Decisions
Rugby World Cup 2019 Tournament statistics

References

Statistics
Rugby union records and statistics